Indian mythology may refer to:

Hindu mythology
Vedic mythology
Meitei mythology (Manipuri mythology)
Mythology of Jainism
Buddhist mythology
Mythology of Sikhism
Mythologies of the indigenous peoples of the Americas

See also
Indian religions
Native American religions